Madea's Big Happy Family is a 2010 American stage play created, produced, written, and directed by Tyler Perry. It stars Tyler Perry as Mabel "Madea" Simmons and Cassi Davis as Aunt Bam. The play also marks the debut appearance of Aunt Bam played by Davis. Perry began writing the show after the death of his mother Willie Maxine Perry on December 8, 2009. The main character of Shirley is based on her. The live performance released on DVD (November 23, 2010) was recorded live in Atlanta at the Cobb Energy Performing Arts Centre on July 16 - 17, 2010.

Plot
Shirley (Chandra Currelley-Young), accompanied by Aunt Bam (Cassi Davis), visits Dr. Frank Wallace (Omarr Dixon). Dr. Wallace tells Shirley that her cancer is active and she might have 4–6 weeks left. Later, Aunt Bam tells Shirley that she invited Madea to come over and help her when she tells her children the news. The scene later switches to the house where Joyce (Cheryl Pepsii Riley) shows up and informs Shirley that she called everybody, later Aunt Bam complains about the fact that she still doesn't have a man. Soon enough, Madea (Tyler Perry) arrives, ready to help Shirley.

When Tammy (Crissy Collins) shows up, Madea informs her that she's very angry with her and her husband Harold (Danny Clay): she gave them $275 to fix her car and it didn't start. Byron (Jeffery Lewis) and his girlfriend Rose (Chontelle Moore) arrive, and Aunt Bam tells Rose she wants her $20, which Rose borrowed about a year ago. Rose says it's petty to ask for such a small amount of money back, then reveals that she dropped $900 on eyeshadow and shoes. Madea convinces Aunt Bam to chase after Rose. Kimberly (Támar Davis) arrives demanding to know why her sisters summoned her to the house, but they don't know themselves. When Donnie (Zuri Craig) comes, he tries to kiss Aunt Bam and Madea, who warns him that she got H1N1 from his last kiss. When Madea quizzes him, he says he's 17 and in the 6th grade, to which she responds that at least he's in school and his children will know he's right down the hall from their classrooms. Harold arrives and Madea repeats what she told Tammy, and now that they're both here she tells them both that if her car isn't fixed when she's ready to leave, they'll have to run like hell. Kimberly's husband, Jason (Rico Ball) rushes in to announce that Uncle Monroe (Palmer Williams Jr.) has arrived; everyone hides their stuff because he's a crack cocaine-addicted kleptomaniac. Uncle Monroe has barely stepped inside when he thinks he smells drugs in the kitchen, which makes him hurry.

Karen (Brandi Milton) stalks in demanding to see Byron, which sparks Rose's jealousy. Karen threatens Byron that if he doesn't pay her some child support, 'the popo's gon' be knockin' at yo' do'!', backed up by Aunt Bam. Madea orders Karen to leave, they're having a family moment. Byron, Karen (and her baby), and Rose leave, Kimberly demands to know why she was called, and Jason chides her for her attitude, which angers her more and she storms out. When Harold points out how Kimberly's behavior is similar to Tammy's, Tammy tells him to shut up and he turns away in shame. Uncle Monroe calls a Man Meeting in the kitchen. He talks Harold into standing up for himself, but when Tammy comes in, he pretends the men are having a Bible study.

Madea notices Byron sagging and tells him to pull up his pants. Shirley looks upset and Donnie and Byron sing her a gospel song. Meanwhile, Donnie finds out from Aunt Bam that Kimberly is his real mother. Madea leaves the house and tries to start her car, but unfortunately for Tammy and Harold, her car wouldn't start. So she gets her gun and starts chasing after Harold and Tammy.

The next day, Shirley's cancer starts taking effect and she assures Joyce that she is all right and that she knows she's close to Heaven. Joyce thanks her for giving her the life they both wanted by Shirley giving her Jesus (You Gave Me Jesus) since Aunt Bam spills that Shirley is sick. That night, Joyce gets a new makeover for the date with Frank that Aunt Bam set up. Then Frank tells her that her mother is in the hospital. Then Shirley tells all her children that she wants them to do the right thing, although she will be gone forever. Shirley dies, and her spirit goes up to Heaven ("Heaven Waits for Me") and this makes everyone sad (as they strongly cry for her loss) and scared of what will happen in their futures without her (calling out to the Lord).

When everyone comes home from the funeral, they gather in the living room. Madea gives everyone advice on what they should do. Karen stops by to express her condolences to Byron, but soon they began to argue. Frustrated, Madea tells Karen to stop worrying about Byron and Rose, stop using her baby to make Byron's life miserable, and keep moving forward. Rose tells Byron it's time to go, but Madea snatches Byron's shirt, re-seating him. When Rose tells Madea she should let her "man" grow up and be a man, Madea uses Uncle Monroe's "Yah, trick!"-choke-move on her. She follows up by lecturing them that the elderly should be treated with respect and dignity, after all, they marched for their freedom. She finally lets them leave and moves on to Harold and Tammy: Tammy shouldn't talk to Harold so harshly, but Harold needs to toughen up. Then she talks to Joyce about how God works through people's prayers. Lastly, Madea reveals that Kimberly was raped by an uncle on her father's side at 12 years old. She then tells her that she has love and needs get past the pain and show it more. Kimberly goes upstairs with Jason and sincerely apologizes for all she's done ("You Are My Man").

Madea goes "off-script" to talk about things that are happening in "the world today." Later, Madea gathers everyone and they all join in singing old songs. Finally, upstairs, Harold asks Tammy to sit down and when she doesn't comply, he yells at her. Harold then resolves the issue between their relationship with a song ("If Only For One Night").

Shows

Cast
 Tyler Perry as Madea
 Cassi Davis as Aunt Bam
 Chandra Currelley-Young as Shirley
 Cheryl Pepsii Riley as Joyce
 Támar Davis as Kimberly
 Jeffery Lewis as Byron
 Zuri Craig as Donnie
 Crissy Collins as Tammy
 Danny Clay as Harold Jones
 Rico Ball as Jason
 Chontelle Moore as Rose
 Brandi Milton as Karen
 Quan Hodges as Dr. Wallace
 Omarr Dixon as Dr. Wallace (filmed version)
 Palmer Williams Jr. as Monroe

The Band 
 Ronnie Garrett - Musical Director & Bass Guitar
 Derek Scott - Guitars
 Marcus Williams - Drums
 Justin Gilbert - Keyboards & Organ
 Natalie Ragins - Keyboards
 Michael Burton - Saxophone
 Jeff Bradshaw - Trombone
 Melvin Jones - Trumpet
 Aaron Draper - Percussion
 Lindsay Fields - Background Vocals
 Latayvia Cherry - Background Vocals
 Donny Sykes - Background Vocals

Musical Numbers 
All songs written and/or produced by Tyler Perry and Elvin D. Ross.
 "People Make the World Go Round" – Company
 "Nothing Left But God" – Aunt Bam
 "Even Me" – Donnie and Byron
 "What Do I Do?" – Shirley, Donnie, Joyce, Byron & Company
 "You Gave Me Jesus" – Joyce
 "You Are My Mama" – Donnie
 "Heaven Waits for Me" – Shirley & Company
 "You Are My Man" – Kimberly
 Medley
 "Tonight Is the Night" – Aunt Bam
 "Can't Hide Love" – Madea & Company
 "Turn Off the Lights" – Monroe & Company
 "(If Loving You Is Wrong) I Don't Want to Be Right" – Tammy
 "I'm Going Down" – Joyce 
 "'Cause I Love You" – Byron & Company
 "If Only for One Night" – Harold

Film adaptation
A film adaptation of the play was released on April 22, 2011.

External links
 
 
 Rotten Tomatoes Review
 Tyler Perry's Madea's Big Happy Family

Plays by Tyler Perry
2010 plays
African-American plays
Plays set in Georgia (U.S. state)
American plays adapted into films